Kofi is an album by the American trumpeter Donald Byrd, featuring performances by Byrd with Frank Foster, Lew Tabackin, Duke Pearson, Ron Carter, Bob Cranshaw, Airto Moreira, Wally Richardson, and Mickey Roker, recorded in 1969 and 1970 and released on the Blue Note label in 1995.

Reception
The AllMusic review by Rob Theakston stated: "The playing here is no less than stellar ... The subtle relaxed tones of this album make it truly one of the essential releases in Byrd's catalog".

Track listing
All compositions by Donald Byrd except as indicated
 "Kofi" - 7:46  
 "Fufu" - 9:39  
 "Perpetual Love" - 7:38  
 "Elmina" - 8:37  
 "The Loud Minority" (Frank Foster) - 9:57 Bonus track on CD

Personnel
Donald Byrd - trumpet
William Campbell - trombone (track 1)
Frank Foster - tenor saxophone
Lew Tabackin - tenor saxophone, flute (tracks 1 & 2)
Duke Pearson - electric piano
Wally Richardson - guitar (tracks 3-5)
Ron Carter - bass
Bob Cranshaw - electric bass (track 2)
Airto Moreira - drums (tracks 1 & 2), percussion (tracks 3-5)
Mickey Roker - drums (tracks 3-5)
Dom Um Romão - percussion (tracks 3-5)

Covers
In 2013, the German House/Techno DJ SCNTST remixed "Kofi" and renamed it "Mind What".

References

Blue Note Records albums
Donald Byrd albums
1995 albums